Dagaare is the language of the Dagaaba people of Ghana, Burkina Faso, and Ivory Coast. It has been described as a dialect continuum that also includes Waale and Birifor. Dagaare language varies in dialect stemming from other family languages including: Dagbane, Waale, Mabia, Gurene, Mampruli, Kusaal, Buli, Niger-Congo, and many other sub languages resulting in around 3 million Dagaare speakers. Throughout the regions of native Dagaare speakers the dialect comes from Northern, Central, Western, and Southern areas referring to the language differently. Burkina Faso refers to Dagaare as Dagara and Birifor to natives in the Republic of Côte d’Ivoire. The native tongue is still universally known as Dagaare. Amongst the different dialects, the standard for Dagaare is derived from the Central region’s dialect. Southern Dagaare (or Waale) also stems from the Dagaare language and is known to be commonly spoken in Wa and Kaleo.

Ethnologue divides Dagaare into three languages:
Southern/Central Dagaare language, which is spoken mainly in Ghana
Northern Dagara language, which is spoken mainly in Burkina Faso
Dagaari Dioula, which is spoken mainly in Burkina Faso, and has significant influence from the genetically unrelated Dioula language

Orthography

Tones are indicated using diacritics:
 the grave accent for the low tone:  ;
 the acute accent for the high tone:  ;
 and no accent for the middle tone.
Nasalization is indicated using the tilde. A nasalized vowel in high or low tone is surmounted by the tilde under the accent.

Phonology
The consonant and vowel sounds in the Dagaare languages:

Vowels

Consonants 

Allophones of  include .

Dagaare consonants on a general scale contains twenty-five consonants and two glides, aka semi-consonants where the certain counterparts may differ. Such as the /h/, /l/, and /m/ counter-part glottal-implosives from Dagaare in its Northern dialect (Burkina Faso).

Grammar

Tone
Dagaare is a tonal language with a two-level tone system with a downstep high tone. The Dagaare tone has two basic functions, namely a lexical and a grammatical function. Its lexical function concerns differences in lexical semantics, such that differing in tone but not in morphosyntactic form triggers different semantics. Its grammatical function is responsible for cases in which different tone markings on a segment result in different semantics of that expression.

Lexical function

Grammatical function

Noun class system

Pronouns
Source:

Personal pronouns
In Dagaare, personal pronouns do not exhibit gender differences. For subject pronouns, there is a distinction between strong and weak personal pronouns. Moreover, there is a distinction between human and non-human forms for third person plural pronouns.

Reflexive pronouns 
Reflexivity is expressed by the words mengɛ or mengɛ tɔr in singular and menne or menne tɔr in plural after any personal pronouns.

Reciprocal pronouns 
Reciprocal pronouns in Dagaare consist of the forms tɔ, tɔ soba, taa and taaba. The most common form is taa.

Relative pronouns 
There is no distinction between human and non-human relative pronouns in Dagaare. For both the relative pronoun is nang.

Interrogative pronouns 
Interrogative pronouns are formed by a root like [bo-] ('what, which') which combines with a suffix. Interrogative pronoun roots in Dagaare include also [yeŋ-] ('where'), [ʔaŋ-] ('who') and [wʊla-] ('how many').

Possessive pronouns 
Possession is expressed by the words toɔr and den in singular and deme in plural, meaning "own", combined with any personal pronoun.

Demonstrative pronouns 
Similarly to the personal pronouns, there is a distinction between human and non-human forms for the third person plural pronouns.

Indefinite pronouns 
Dagaare does not seem to have indefinite pronouns and rather combines a noun like "person" or "body" with the element kang in order to express indefinites like "somebody" or "someone".

Syntax

Word order
Dagaare has basically a SVO word order. This can be seen in the following examples showing an intransitive clause, a transitive clause including an adverb and a ditransitive clause.

Verb phrase
The VP in Dagaare consists of a preverbal particle encoding tense, the predicate, and a postverbal particle with a function yet to be fully investigated.

Preverbal particles 
Daagare marks past and future tenses by the use of preverbal particles. Present tense in not marked or lexicalized in this language. These preverbal particles function like auxiliary verbs in Indo-European languages lexicalizing tense and aspectual features.

Contrary to Indo-European languages like English, French and Norwegian, Dagaare exhibits the lexicalization of a habitual marker. While in the Indo-European languages this habitual marker is basically an adverb, in Dagaare it is realized as the preverbal particle mang. This preverbal particle can only occur after the subject, thus it is not an adverb, since adverbs are more flexible in the positions they can potentially occur in within the clause.

Major particles 

These preverbal particles are difficult to classify as temporal, aspectual, modal and polar, since the relationship between polarity and tense in the Mabia languages is very tight. This means that a particular preverbal particle can express a positive or negative action in the past (da) or a positive or negative action in the future (na). The na particle for instance does not only mark tense, but also positivity of an action. Its counterpart kong is not simply the negation of an action, but also indicating the tense of this action.

Main verb 
The main verb in Dagaare consists of a verb stem and a suffix. This suffix encodes perfective or imperfective aspect. In this system, the speaker considers an action as either completed or not yet completed, irrespective of whether the action happens in the present or past tense. There is the verbal suffix form -ng in Dagaare, whose function is to affirm or emphasize the verbal action. This affix is in complementary distribution with the postverbal particle la, also shown in the subsection on this postverbal particle.

Most verb roots in Dagaare are monosyllabic and combine with inflectional affixes. As already mentioned, the main inflectional affixes in Dagaare express aspect. There are then three distinct inflectional affix forms, one imperfective or progressive affix (-ro) and two perfective or completive affixes (-∅, -e). Imperative forms are homophonous with the perfective transitive forms. An interesting aspect of the Mabia verbal system is that verbs can be classified into pairs of oppositions depending on causativity, transitivity, reversivity and other derivational processes.

Postverbal particle 
The postverbal particle la mainly marks factivity, polarity, affirmation or even emphasis.* It usually occurs in postverbal position, but under particular pragmatic constraints it can also occur preverbally. The la particle is in complementary distribution with negative polarity particles.

*Note that the postverbal particle is glossed as FOC here. Since its glossing in the literature is not consistent and therefore its syntactic nature is not so clear, I thus propose that the postverbal particle may function as a focus marker, while previous research assumed it to be a factive marker.

Besides being in complementary distribution with negative polarity particles, there are four main constraints on the la particle in Dagaare. Firstly, it never occurs after adjuncts postverbally.

Secondly, it occurs before all full NP complements, but it never intervenes between any two full NPs nor follows them.

Thirdly, a pronominal complement must intervene between the verb and the postverbal particle. In this case the affixal form of the particle -ng is attached to the indirect object pronoun ma.

Lastly, under pragmatic circumstances the particle can occur in certain positions within the clause in order to emphasize the role of particular elements. In the example below, the particle either occurs after the subject NP and before the verb in order to focus the subject and not the action of the sentence or the particle occurs postverbally in order to focus the action and not the subject of the clause.

Questions
There are two types of questions in Dagaare. Usually, questions are formed by a question word in the sentence-initial position, but in a few cases there is either a question marker that has to occur in sentence-final position or the question word can appear in situ.

Ex situ 
The Dagaare bong questions correspond to wh-questions in English, but since most of the question words in Dagaare start with the letter b, it makes no sense to refer to them as wh-questions as well and therefore one can refer to them as bong questions. These questions exhibit the question word ex situ and vary according to its Q-element.

In some cases, the Q-element is followed not only by the particle lá, but additionally by the complementizer kà. This might indicate that the Q-element occupies the specifier position and the complementizer appears in the head position of the CP. The particle lá occurs in between both elements and might mark focus, in this case verbal focus.

Lastly, multiple questions are highly marked in Dagaare. In these cases, one Q-element occurs ex situ and the other one(s) in situ.

In situ 
Examples for a question that do not exhibit the question word ex situ are the so-called bee questions, which are known as yes-/no- questions in languages like English. These questions only require a yes- or no-answer instead of a more complex and informative answer. Bee is here the particular question marker, which has to appear obligatorily as the final element of the clause. These questions can express contrastive focus.

Besides this type of question, there are cases, in which the question word can also appear in situ. These questions might correspond to echo questions.

Long distance extraction 
In Dagaare the question word can cross a clause-boundary, which gives rise to long distance extraction. The following examples illustrates the potential positions within the clause, in which the question word can occur. Note that only in the second example below a focus marker occurs, which varies from la to na. Moreover, the two complementizers indicate the clause boundary across which the question word has been moved.

References

External links

Alphabet and pronunciation at Omniglot
Bodomo, Adams, "The Dagaare language and its speakers: Introduction"
PanAfriL10n page on Dagaare
Bibliography of Dagaare Studies
Journal of Dagaare Studies
Database of audio recordings in Dagara - basic Catholic prayers
Web version of Ethnologue
The VP-periphery in Mabia languages

Oti–Volta languages
Languages of Ghana
Languages of Burkina Faso